Kalamitsi is a village of the Grevena municipality. The 2011 census recorded 29 residents in the village. Kalamitsi is a part of the community of Grevena.

See also
 List of settlements in the Grevena regional unit

References

Populated places in Grevena (regional unit)